This is a list of notable Business Process Model and Notation 2.0 (BPMN 2.0) Workflow Management Systems (WfMSs).

List of BPMN 2.0 engines

See also 

 Comparison of Business Process Modeling Notation tools
 List of BPEL engines

Notes

References

BPMN 2.0 engines
Middleware
BPMN